Khvajeh Hesar (also Romanized as Khvājeh Ḩeşār; also known as Khājeh Ḩeşārī, Khvājeh Ḩeşārī, Khwajehsar, and Kīveh Jīlar) is a village in Pish Khowr Rural District, Pish Khowr District, Famenin County, Hamadan Province, Iran. At the 2006 census, its population was 50, in 11 families.

References 

Populated places in Famenin County